I Don't Think About It is a song performed by Emily Osment for R. L. Stine's The Haunting Hour: Don't Think About It. The song hit #1 on the Radio Disney top 3. Osment also shot an accompanying music video for the song, released in The Haunting Hour: Don't Think About It DVD.  The song was written by Ilene Angel and Sue Fabisch.

Music video
The music video shows Osment singing the song in a recording studio. Throughout the video are scenes Osment singing to the song with various animations in the background. Another portion of the video shows clips from the movie The Haunting Hour: Don't Think About It. The video also shows various behind the scenes footage. An alternative version of the music video was shown during the end credits of The Haunting Hour: Don't Think About It that only features Osment singing the song in a recording studio.

Release history

References

External links
 DVD site
 Official Movie Site
 Canadian DVD site

2007 debut singles
2007 songs
Emily Osment songs
Songs written by Matthew Wilder
Songs written for films